Dečje novine (Children's newspaper) was a publishing house based in Gornji Milanovac. It was known as the largest comics publisher of the former Yugoslavia. It also published books, magazines and sticker albums. They had almost exclusive right to publish comics of The Walt Disney Company in Yugoslavia, and excelled as publishers of DC Comics and Marvel Comics comic books.

Dečje novine were founded in 1956 by Srećko Jovanović. With the outbreak of war in Yugoslavia and the collapse of the state they collapsed in the early 1990s. Bankruptcy lasted until 2001, when it sold the remaining assets to settle the numerous creditors.

Main publications 
Dečje novine (magazine for school children, mainly with content meant for the higher grades)
Tik-Tak (magazine for school children, for younger children)
Zeka (magazine for school children, for younger children)
Eks almanah (comic magazine, included a wide variety of comics in every issue)
Yu strip, later Yu strip magazin (published exclusively comics of domestic authors)
Gigant (comic magazine)
Nikad robom (comic magazine)
Džuboks (music magazine)
Moment (visual media magazine)
Venac (literature and culture magazine)

References

Publishing companies established in 1956
Publishing companies of Serbia
Gornji Milanovac
Serbian comics
Yugoslav comics
Yugoslav science fiction
Magazine publishing companies
Comics publishing companies
1956 establishments in Yugoslavia
2001 disestablishments in Serbia
Publishing companies disestablished in 2001